Diego Fernando Nadaya (born 15 September 1989) is an Argentine footballer.

Career

Nadaya previously played for Instituto Atlético Central Córdoba and Club Atlético Platense.

San Martín de San Juan

In 2010, he moved to San Martín de San Juan. He made his debut against San Martín de Tucumán in a 0–0 home draw. He completed 5 appearances but he did not manage to score any goal in the league.

CD Universidad San Martín

In 2011, he moved to CD Universidad San Martín. On 19 February, Nadaya capped his debut with a goal, scoring San Martín's first goal in a 2–1 home win against Universidad César Vallejo Club de Fútbol. He completed 15 appearances having scored 5 goals.

Centro Deportivo Olmedo

In 2012, he moved to Centro Deportivo Olmedo. He made his debut against Técnico Universitario in a 0–3 home loss. He scored his first goal against Deportivo Quito in a 4–4 win. He completed 10 appearances having scored 1 goal.

Olympiakos Volou 1937 F.C.

On 8 February 2013 he moved to Olympiakos Volou 1937 F.C. His first goal came against Anagennisi Giannitsa in a 1–0 home win. His next goal came three days later against Doxa Drama F.C. He also scored against Thrasyvoulos F.C. in a 3–1 home win.

Amicale FC

In February 2016, Diego sign for Vanuatu side Amicale FC.

References

External links
 Profile at BDFA 
 
 Diego Nadaya at Footballdatabase

1989 births
Living people
Argentine footballers
Argentine expatriate footballers
Club Atlético Platense footballers
San Martín de San Juan footballers
Instituto footballers
C.D. Olmedo footballers
Cobresal footballers
CS Constantine players
Club Almirante Brown footballers
Mumbai City FC players
Independiente Rivadavia footballers
Amicale F.C. players
Chilean Primera División players
Primera Nacional players
Ecuadorian Serie A players
Indian Super League players
Expatriate footballers in Chile
Expatriate footballers in Peru
Expatriate footballers in Ecuador
Expatriate footballers in Algeria
Expatriate footballers in Greece
Expatriate footballers in India
Expatriate footballers in Vanuatu
Argentine expatriate sportspeople in Chile
Argentine expatriate sportspeople in Peru
Argentine expatriate sportspeople in Ecuador
Argentine expatriate sportspeople in Algeria
Argentine expatriate sportspeople in Greece
Argentine expatriate sportspeople in India
Footballers from Córdoba, Argentina
Association football forwards